KVVL (97.1 FM) is a radio station in Maryville, Missouri, which airs an alternative rock format. It is owned by the Regional Media-Virden Broadcasting.

History
The station began broadcasting in September 1972, holding the call sign KNIM-FM, simulcast the programming of AM 1580 KNIM. It originally broadcast at 95.3 MHz. On August 4, 2010, its call sign was changed to KVVL reflecting its branding as the Ville.

On December 31, 2021, Regional Media acquired the station and its sister station KNIM from Nodaway Broadcasting which had been owned by Jim and Joyce Cronin since 1996. On January 14, 2022, Regional Media flipped the station from classic rock to alternative rock, and rebranded to "Real Alternative Radio". At that time, the station also added the syndicated The Bob & Tom Show in morning drive.

References

External links

Nodaway County, Missouri
VVL
Modern rock radio stations in the United States
Radio stations established in 1972
1972 establishments in Missouri